Preußens Gloria, Armeemarschsammlung II, 240, is a well-known military march of the 19th century, composed by Johann Gottfried Piefke (1817–1884).

"Preußens Gloria" ("The Glory of Prussia" or "Prussia's Glory") was written in 1871 after the Kingdom of Prussia's victory in the Franco-Prussian War, which led to the unification of the German states into the new Prussian-led German Empire. As part of the victory parade of the returning troops, the march was performed for the first time in public in Frankfurt an der Oder, where Piefke's garrison was based.

As Piefke only performed it on important occasions, the march was unknown to a broader public for a long time. In 1909 the manuscript of the almost forgotten tune turned up and was reworked by army-musical inspector Prof. Grawert. Shortly afterwards it was included in the collection of Prussian army marches.

When the Nazi Party came to power in 1933, the famous march became a staple of nationalistic triumph spurred by the propaganda movement for the reclaiming of former glory for the nation.

Today it is one of the best known German army marches. It is often played by the Bundeswehr at official ceremonies and state visits. It is also a standard tune in many international military bands. In Germany it is often played by non-professional bands due to its popularity. It has also been adopted by units in other armies, for example by the First Squadron, Honourable Artillery Company. The song is often played by marching bands in Northern Ireland. Also, it is played in the Military Parades of Chile, performed by the Chilean Army. It is also played by the Royal Swedish Army Band and the British Army. The National People's Army of East Germany was not allowed to play the march.

Lyrics 
Although Preußens Gloria has no official lyrics, in May 2021, Karl Sternau, a Music Historian, wrote unofficial lyrics for the aforementioned song:

German Lyrics
Die Fahne hoch, mit Schwur voran!
Marschieren, wir Preußen nun Mann für Mann!
Es gibt niemanden auf der Welt,
der uns den Sieg nehmen kann!

Solang ein Tropfen Blut noch glüht,
so sind wir Preußen stets bemüht!
Solang der deutsche Stolz noch steht,
und niemand auf die Knie geht:

Hoch Preußenland! Hoch Preußenland!
Gott schütze es durch seine Hand!
Stolz, mutig, ehrenvoll zugleich:
Du Perle im heiligen Reich!

Schwarz-Weiß, die Fahne uns weht. Voran! Ja, voran!

Von Potsdam bis nach Königsberg,
Vollbringen Preußen stolz ihr Werk,
Im Geiste von des Alten Fritz,
Wir stets bewahren sein Antlitz!

Und in alle Ewigkeit!
Niemals uns ein Feind entzweit!
Seiest du, mein Preußen, hier,
Der ganzen Menschheit edle Zier!

Und vom schönen Annaberg
Grüßt uns Rübezahl mit Zwerg
Du, geliebtes Vaterland:
Sei stark, mit Gottes rechter Hand!

English translation
The flag high, with oath ahead!
We Prussians march man for man!
There is no one in the world
who can take away our victory!

As long as a drop of blood still glows,
we Prussians are always striving!
As long as German pride still stands,
and no one goes down on his knees:

Hail Prussia! Hail Prussia!
God protect it by his hand!
Proud, brave, honorable at the same time:
You pearl in the holy empire!

Black and white flies the flag for us. Forward! Yes, forward!

From Potsdam to Königsberg,
Prussians proudly carry out their work,
In the spirit of Old Fritz,
We always preserve his memory!

And for all eternity
never an enemy will divide us!
Be thou my Prussia,
the noble ornament of all mankind!

And from the beautiful Annaberg
greets us Rübezahl with dwarf
You, beloved fatherland:
Be strong, with God's right hand!

References

External links
 
 Preußens Gloria, with lyrics. Retrieved 30 April 2022

Culture of Prussia
German military marches
German patriotic songs
Compositions by Johann Gottfried Piefke
Articles containing video clips